Edmund Valentine White III (born 1940) is an American novelist, memoirist, playwright, biographer and an essayist on literary and social topics. Since 1999 he has been a professor at Princeton University. France made him  (and later ) de l'Ordre des Arts et des Lettres in 1993.

White's books include The Joy of Gay Sex, written with Charles Silverstein (1977); his trilogy of semi-autobiographic novels, A Boy's Own Story (1982), The Beautiful Room Is Empty (1988) and The Farewell Symphony (1997); and his biography of Jean Genet. Much of his writing is on the theme of same-sex love.

White has also written biographies of three French writers: Jean Genet, Marcel Proust and Arthur Rimbaud. He is the namesake of the Edmund White Award for Debut Fiction, awarded annually by Publishing Triangle.

Early life and education
Edmund Valentine White mostly grew up in Chicago, Illinois. He attended Cranbrook School in Bloomfield Hills, Michigan, as a boy. Afterward, he studied Chinese at the University of Michigan, graduating in 1962.

Incestuous feelings colored his early family life. White stated that his mother, for instance, was sexually attracted to him. He, moreover, spoke of his own attraction to his father: "I think with my father he was somebody who every eye in the family was focused on and he was a sort of a tyrant and nice-looking, the source of all power, money, happiness, and he was implacable and difficult. He was always spoken of in sexual terms, in the sense he left our mother for a much younger woman who was very sexy but had nothing else going for her. He was a famous womanizer. And he slept with my sister!" He has also stated: "Writing has always been my recourse when I've tried to make sense of my experience or when it's been very painful. When I was 15 years old, I wrote my first (unpublished) novel about being gay, at a time when there were no other gay novels. So I was really inventing a genre, and it was a way of administering a therapy to myself, I suppose."

White was present at the Stonewall Inn in 1969 when the Stonewall uprising began. He later wrote, "Ours may have been the first funny revolution. When someone shouted 'Gay is good' in imitation of 'Black is beautiful', we all laughed; at that moment we went from seeing ourselves as a mental illness to thinking we were a minority".

White declined admission to Harvard University's Chinese doctoral program in favor of following a lover to New York. There he freelanced for Newsweek and spent seven years working as a staffer at Time-Life Books. After briefly relocating to Rome, San Francisco, and then returning to New York, he was briefly employed as an editor for the Saturday Review when the magazine was based in San Francisco in the early 1970s; after the magazine folded in 1973, White returned to New York to edit Horizon (a quarterly cultural journal) and freelance as a writer and editor for entities, including Time-Life and The New Republic.

Personal life
White identifies as gay and is also an atheist, though he was reared as a Christian Scientist. He discovered he was HIV-positive in 1985. However, he is a "non-progressor", one of the small percentage of cases that have not led to AIDS. He is in a long-term open relationship with the American writer Michael Carroll, living with him from 1995 onward.

In June 2012, Carroll reported that White was making a "remarkable" recovery after suffering two strokes in previous months. He has also had a heart attack.

Influences
In his 2005 memoir My Lives, White cites Jean Genet, Marcel Proust and André Gide as influences, writing: "they convinced me that homosexuality was crucial to the development of the modern novel because it led to a resurrection of love, a profound scepticism about the naturalness of gender roles and a revival of the classical tradition of same-sex love that dominated Western poetry and prose until the birth of Christ".

His favorite living writers in the early 1970s were Vladimir Nabokov and Christopher Isherwood.

Literary career
White wrote books and plays while a youth, including one unpublished novel titled Mrs Morrigan.

Much of White's work draws on his experience of being gay. His debut novel, Forgetting Elena (1973), set on an island, can be read as commenting on gay culture in a coded manner. The Russian-American novelist Vladimir Nabokov called it "a marvelous book". Written with his psychotherapist Charles Silverstein, The Joy of Gay Sex (1977) made him known to a wider readership. It is celebrated for its sex-positive tone. His next novel, Nocturnes for the King of Naples (1978) was explicitly gay-themed and drew on his own life.

From 1980 to 1981, White was a member of a gay writers' group, The Violet Quill, which met briefly during that period, and included Andrew Holleran and Felice Picano. White's autobiographic works are frank and unapologetic about his promiscuity and his HIV-positive status.

In 1980, he brought out States of Desire, a survey of some aspects of gay life in America. In 1982, he helped found the group Gay Men's Health Crisis in New York City. In the same year appeared White's best-known work, A Boy's Own Story — the first volume of an autobiographic-fiction series, continuing  with The Beautiful Room Is Empty (1988) and The Farewell Symphony (1997), describing stages in the life of a gay man from boyhood to middle age. Several characters in the latter novel are recognizably based on well-known people from White's New York-centered literary and artistic milieu.

From 1983 to 1990 White lived in France. He moved there initially for one year in 1983 via the Guggenheim Fellowship for writing he had received, but took such a liking to Paris "with its drizzle, as cool, grey and luxurious as chinchilla," (as he described it in his autobiographical novel The Farewell Symphony) that he stayed there for longer. French philosopher Michel Foucault invited him for dinner on several occasions, though he dismissed White's concerns about HIV/AIDS (Foucault would die of the illness shortly afterward). In 1984 in Paris, shortly after discovering he was HIV-positive, White joined the French HIV/AIDS organisation, AIDES. During this period, he brought out his novel, Caracole (1985), which centres on heterosexual relationships. But he also maintained an interest in France and French literature, writing biographies of Jean Genet, Marcel Proust and Arthur Rimbaud. He published Genet: a biography (1993), Our Paris: sketches from memory (1995), Marcel Proust (1998), The Flaneur: a stroll through the paradoxes of Paris (2000) and Rimbaud (2008). He spent seven years writing the biography of Genet.

White came back to the United States in 1997. The Married Man, a novel published in 2000, is gay-themed and draws on White's life. Fanny: A Fiction (2003) is a historical novel about novelist Frances Trollope and social reformer Frances Wright in early 19th-century America. White's 2006 play Terre Haute (produced in New York City in 2009) portrays discussions that take place when a prisoner, based on terrorist bomber Timothy McVeigh, is visited by a writer based on Gore Vidal. (In real life McVeigh and Vidal corresponded but did not meet.)

In 2005 White published his autobiography, My Lives — organised by theme rather than chronology — and in 2009 his memoir of New York life in the 1960s and 1970s, City Boy.

White himself was the subject of a biography by Stephen Barber. His response to the book was that Barber "had a very romantic vision of me. It was very flattering. He painted me as a brooding figure. I see myself as much more self-mocking and satirical. I just skimmed that biography. As Genet put it, I didn't want to end up resembling myself".

From 1999 onwards, White became professor of creative writing in Princeton University's Lewis Center for the Arts.

Awards and honors
White has received numerous awards and distinctions. Recipient of the inaugural Bill Whitehead Award for Lifetime Achievement from Publishing Triangle in 1989, he is also the namesake of the organization's Edmund White Award for Debut Fiction.

In 2014, Edmund White was presented with the Bonham Centre Award from the Mark S. Bonham Centre for Sexual Diversity Studies, University of Toronto, for his contributions to the advancement and education of issues around sexual identification.

1983: Guggenheim Fellowship for Creative Arts
1988: Lambda Literary Award, for The Beautiful Room Is Empty
1989: Bill Whitehead Award for Lifetime Achievement
1992: Lambda Literary Award nomination, for Faber Book of Gay Short Fiction
1993: David R. Kessler Award in LGBTQ Studies, CLAGS: The Center for LGBTQ Studies
1993: National Book Critics Circle Award for Biography, for Genet
1993:  (and later ) de l'Ordre des Arts et des Lettres
1994: Pulitzer Prize for Biography or Autobiography nomination, for Genet: A Biography
1994: Lambda Literary Award, for Genet: A Biography
1996: Member, American Academy of Arts and Letters
1996: Lambda Literary Award nomination, for Our Paris
1998: Lambda Literary Award nomination, for The Farewell Symphony
2001: Lambda Literary Award nomination, for The Married Man
2002: Stonewall Book Award for Loss within Loss: Artists in the Age of AIDS

2016–2018: New York State Edith Wharton Citation of Merit
2018: PEN/Saul Bellow Award for Achievement in American Fiction
2019: National Book Foundation, Lifetime Achievement Award

Works

Fiction
 Forgetting Elena (1973) 
 Nocturnes for the King of Naples (1978) , 
 A Boy's Own Story (1982) , 
 Caracole (1985) , 
 The Beautiful Room Is Empty (1988) 
 Skinned Alive: Stories (1995) 
 The Farewell Symphony (1997) 
 The Married Man (2000) 
 Fanny: A Fiction (2003) 
 Chaos: A Novella and Stories (2007) 
 Hotel de Dream (2007) 
 Jack Holmes and His Friend (2012) , 
 Our Young Man (2016) , 
 A Saint from Texas (2020) 
 A Previous Life (2022) 
 The Humble Lover (2023)

Plays
 Terre Haute (2006)

Nonfiction
 The Joy of Gay Sex, with Charles Silverstein (1977) 
 States of Desire (1980) 
 The Burning Library: Writings on Art, Politics and Sexuality 1969–1993 (1994) , 
 The Flâneur: A Stroll Through the Paradoxes of Paris (2000) 
 Arts and Letters (2004) , 
 Sacred Monsters (2011)

Biography
 Genet: A Biography (1993) , 
 Marcel Proust (1998) , 
 Rimbaud: The Double Life of a Rebel (2008) ,

Memoir
 Our Paris: Sketches from Memory (1995) 
 My Lives (2005) 
 City Boy (2009) , 
 Inside a Pearl: My Years in Paris (2014) , 
 The Unpunished Vice: A Life of Reading (2018)

Anthologies
 The Darker Proof: Stories from a Crisis, with Adam Mars-Jones (1988)
 In Another Part of the Forest: An Anthology of Gay Short Fiction (1994) 
 The Art of the Story (2000) 
 A Fine Excess: Contemporary Literature at Play (2001)

Articles
 White, Edmund. "My Women. Learning how to love them", The New Yorker, June 13, 2005. Autobiographical article excerpted from My Lives.

See also

 LGBT culture in New York City
 List of American novelists
 List of LGBT writers
 List of LGBT people from New York City

References

Further reading
 Doten, Mark. "Interview with Edmund White" , Bookslut, February 2007.
 Fleming, Keith. "Uncle Ed". Granta 68 (Winter 1999). (A memoir by Edmund White's nephew who lived with White in the 1970s.)
 Morton, Paul. (April 6, 2006)  "Interview: Edmund White", EconoCulture. Retrieved April 29, 2006.
 Teeman, Tim. (July 29, 2006) "Inside a mind set to explode", The Times (London). Retrieved January 9, 2007.

External links

 Official website
 Official webpage at Princeton
Edmund White Papers. Yale Collection of American Literature, Beinecke Rare Book and Manuscript Library.

Interview with Edmund White, Untitled Books
of Edmund White's lecture "A Man's Own Story," delivered at the Key West Literary Seminar, January 2008
Transcript of interview with Ramona Koval on The Book Show, ABC Radio National November 7, 2007
 White article archive and bio from The New York Review of Books
 An excerpt from White's memoir City Boy

1940 births
Living people
American atheists
American expatriates in France
American gay writers
American LGBT novelists
American male biographers
American male dramatists and playwrights
American male essayists
American male novelists
American memoirists
American relationships and sexuality writers
Cranbrook Educational Community alumni
Lambda Literary Award for Gay Fiction winners
Gay memoirists
LGBT people from Illinois
LGBT people from Michigan
LGBT people from New Jersey
LGBT people from New York (state)
LGBT people from Ohio
Members of the American Academy of Arts and Letters
Novelists from Illinois
Novelists from Michigan
Novelists from New Jersey
Novelists from New York (state)
Novelists from Ohio
People with HIV/AIDS
Princeton University faculty
20th-century American biographers
20th-century American dramatists and playwrights
20th-century American essayists
20th-century American male writers
20th-century American novelists
20th-century atheists
21st-century American biographers
21st-century American dramatists and playwrights
21st-century American essayists
21st-century American male writers
21st-century American novelists
21st-century atheists
University of Michigan alumni
Writers from Chicago
Writers from Cincinnati
Writers from New York City
Writers from Paris